Joshua is a surname. Notable people with the name include:

 Anthony Joshua (born 1989), British professional boxer
 Bob Joshua (1906–1970), Australian politician
 Dakota Joshua (born 1996), American ice hockey player
 Daryne Joshua (born 1992), South African filmmaker
 Ebenezer Joshua (1908–1991), Vincentian politician
 Hirondina Joshua (born 1987), Mozambican poet
 Ivy Joshua (1924–1992), Grenadian trade unionist and politician
 Maurice Joshua, American record producer
 Neo Jessica Joshua (born 1987), better known as Nao, English singer-songwriter
 Prem Joshua (born 1958), German-Indian musician
 Rosemary Joshua (born 1964), Welsh operatic soprano
 T. B. Joshua (1963–2021), Nigerian charismatic pastor
 Von Joshua (born 1948), American baseball player

See also
 Joshua (name), a given name, including a list of people with the name
 Joshua (disambiguation)